Orthocomotis similis is a species of moth of the family Tortricidae. It is found in Costa Rica.

The length of the forewings 10.5-12.5 mm. The ground colour of the forewings is pale brown with patches of metallic green and darker brown overscaling. The hindwings are pale brown.

Etymology
The species name refers to the similarity between the genitalia of the species and those of Orthocomotis phenax.

References

Moths described in 2003
Orthocomotis